Patrice Bianchi (born 10 April 1969 in Bourg-Saint-Maurice) is a French former alpine skier who competed in the 1992 Winter Olympics.

External links
 sports-reference.com

1969 births
Living people
French male alpine skiers
Olympic alpine skiers of France
Alpine skiers at the 1992 Winter Olympics
People from Bourg-Saint-Maurice
Sportspeople from Savoie
20th-century French people